Vildan Mitku (born 26 January 1983 in Shkodër, Albania) is a 200 cm tall Albanian professional basketball player. He currently plays for Tigers Tübingen in the Basketball Bundesliga.

External links
EuroBasket Profile

1983 births
Living people
Basketball players from Shkodër
Albanian men's basketball players
Small forwards